Wola Jabłońska  is a village in the administrative district of Gmina Rakoniewice, within Grodzisk Wielkopolski County, Greater Poland Voivodeship, in west-central Poland.

References

 

Villages in Grodzisk Wielkopolski County